Dean Curtis May (born May 26, 1962) is a former American football quarterback in the National Football League who played for the Philadelphia Eagles and Denver Broncos. Over the course of his NFL career he completed one pass in six attempts. After graduating from Chamberlain High School in Tampa, Florida in 1980, he played college football for the Louisville Cardinals.

References

1962 births
Living people
American football quarterbacks
Philadelphia Eagles players
Denver Broncos players
Louisville Cardinals football players